Moody is a city in McLennan County, Texas, United States. The population was 1,376 at the 2020 census. It is part of the Waco Metropolitan Statistical Area.

Geography

Moody is located at  (31.307489, –97.360210).

Demographics

As of the 2020 United States census, there were 1,376 people, 513 households, and 340 families residing in the city.

As of the census of 2000, there were 1,400 people, 529 households, and 369 families residing in the city. The population density was 1,645.7 people per square mile (635.9/km). There were 616 housing units at an average density of 724.1 per square mile (279.8/km). The racial makeup of the city was 82.71% White, 8.79% African American, 0.36% Native American, 0.14% Pacific Islander, 6.57% from other races, and 1.43% from two or more races. Hispanic or Latino of any race were 14.93% of the population.

There were 529 households, out of which 33.5% had children under the age of 18 living with them, 54.4% were married couples living together, 12.9% had a female householder with no husband present, and 30.2% were non-families. 27.4% of all households were made up of individuals, and 16.3% had someone living alone who was 65 years of age or older. The average household size was 2.57 and the average family size was 3.14.

In the city, the population was spread out, with 27.2% under the age of 18, 8.6% from 18 to 24, 25.8% from 25 to 44, 20.5% from 45 to 64, and 17.9% who were 65 years of age or older. The median age was 36 years. For every 100 females, there were 85.9 males. For every 100 females age 18 and over, there were 80.4 males.

The median income for a household in the city was $26,974, and the median income for a family was $34,271. Males had a median income of $28,828 versus $21,204 for females. The per capita income for the city was $13,048. About 16.3% of families and 18.2% of the population were below the poverty line, including 22.1% of those under age 18 and 18.7% of those age 65 or over.

Education
The City of Moody is served by the Moody Independent School District.

References

External links
 http://www.moodytexas.com

Cities in McLennan County, Texas
Cities in Texas